Erica Musci (born April 6, 1990), better known by her stage name Erica Mou, is an Italian singer and musician. Born in Bisceglie, Italy, she began studying singing at the age of 5, and playing guitar at 11.

After some minor musical experience, in 2008 she released her first album (with label Auand), Bacio Ancora le Ferite and began playing concerts. She won several prizes, including the award for "Best Lyrics" at SIAE and "New Indie Pop Artist" at M.E.I. (Meeting delle Etichette Indipendenti).

Her version of Don't Stop, originally by Fleetwood Mac, was the soundtrack to Eni commercials starting from January 2011.

In March 2011 she released her first major album, È, on Sugar. The album produced by Valgeir Sigurðsson (Björk, Sigur Rós) and arranged by Valgeir Sigurðsson and MaJiKer was anticipated by the first single "Giungla", with a video directed by Valentina Be and inspired by the true story of young model Tom Nicon’s suicide.

In October 2011 she toured in the United States for the Hit Week Festival, performing in New York City, Los Angeles and Miami.

In 2012 she entered the Sanremo Music Festival with the song "Nella vasca da bagno del tempo", winning the Mia Martini critics award.

In 2020 she released a novel "Nel mare c'è la sete", which will be released in English as "Thirsty Sea" in 2022.

Discography

Albums

EPs

Singles

Featured singles

Other appearances

Notes

External links
 Official website

1990 births
Living people
Italian singer-songwriters
21st-century Italian singers
21st-century Italian women singers